Launglon is a town in Dawei District, in Tanintharyi Division, Burma.  It is about 13 miles from Dawei.

Notable People 

Ma Chit Po

Townships of Taninthayi Region